The Cannes Conference was a formal conclave of nations held in Cannes, France, from 6 January to 13 January, 1922. It brought together the Allied nations of the First World War.

The Cannes Conference primarily revolved around discussions between French Prime Minister Aristide Briand and UK Prime Minister David Lloyd George regarding war reparations by Germany under the Treaty of Versailles. Briand's departure on 12 January, and the collapse of his government the next day resulted in the ending of the conference.

Further reading 
 

Conference
20th-century diplomatic conferences
1922 conferences
1922 in France
Diplomatic conferences in France
Aftermath of World War I
World War I conferences
January 1922 events
History of diplomacy